Deveraux is a surname, derived from the French Devereux (likely influenced by the common English pronunciation of that name, "Devero"). Notable people with the surname include:

James Deveraux (1903–1988), United States Marine Corps general, Navy Cross recipient, and Republican congressman
Jude Deveraux (born 1947), American author
Tricia Deveraux (born 1975), American former pornographic actress

Fictional characters:
Abigail Deveraux, character on the NBC daytime drama Days of our Lives
Blanche Deveraux, character on the 1985–1992 NBC sitcom The Golden Girls
Dominique Deveraux, character on the American TV series 'Dynasty and its spin-off The Colbys
Jack Deveraux, character on the NBC daytime drama Days of our Lives
 Jeannette Deveraux, Wing Commander character
JJ Deveraux, character on the NBC daytime drama Days of our Lives
 Luc Deveraux, the protagonist of the Universal Soldier film series
 Sophie Devereaux character on the TV show Leverage

See also
Devara
Devereaux
Devereux
Deverra
Dovera

Surnames of Norman origin